Harry Edwin Kinney (June 7, 1924 – May 9, 2006) was 21st & 23rd Mayor of Albuquerque for two terms, from 1974 to 1977 and again from 1981 to 1985, as well as Chairman of the City Commission from 1971 to 1973. Among his accomplishments as mayor were initiating the Albuquerque International Balloon Fiesta, preserving the Elena Gallegos Land Grant for open space, and establishing the first bike trail and senior center in the city.

Born in Trinidad, Colorado, Kinney attended Raton High School and graduated from the University of New Mexico with a degree in mechanical engineering. He served in the United States Navy and the Navy Reserve and owned an appliance store, before working for Sandia National Laboratories as a staff engineer on weapons development, from 1956 to 1973.

Kinney entered politics when he was elected to the Bernalillo County Commission in 1956, and twice reelected in 1958 and 1960. He was first elected to the Albuquerque City Commission in 1966 and served as chairman from 1971 to 1973. Additionally, he served as an assistant to Senator Pete Domenici before his first term as mayor.

After his retirement from public life, Kinney was a substitute teacher in the Albuquerque public schools, and drove a taxi cab for five years. He died at his Albuquerque home on May 9, 2006. The Harry E. Kinney Civic Plaza in downtown Albuquerque is named in his honor.

References

External links

1924 births
2006 deaths
20th-century American politicians
20th-century American engineers
American taxi drivers
County commissioners in New Mexico
Mayors of Albuquerque, New Mexico
New Mexico Republicans
People from Trinidad, Colorado
United States Navy reservists
University of New Mexico alumni